PT Yupi Indo Jelly Gum, better known as Yupi, is an Indonesian gummy jelly manufacturer. Yupi service many markets and private label customers around the world. Starting up with a joint venture with Trolli, one of the leading gummy manufacturers in Europe, Yupi has been the market leader in gummy confectionery product in Indonesia since 1996 and the largest player in South East Asia, according to its website.

Products
Strawberry Kiss
Iced Cola
Jungle Fun
Dino Land
Sea World
Fang
Lips
Burger
Hot Dog
Pizza
Sweet Heart
Fruit Cocktail
Aquarium
Mummy
Phyton
Neon Stix
Bears
Little Star
Fun Gum
Apple Ring
Peach Ring
Milly Moos
Lunch
Seasonal, as valentine Imlek and Lebaran
Mango
Roletto
etc.

See also
Trolli, a German-based gummie brand owned by Mederer Corporation.

References

External links
Official site

Confectionery companies of Indonesia
Companies based in Bogor
Brand name confectionery
Indonesian brands